The Vice-President of Council of the New Jersey Legislature would succeed the Governor (who was the President of the Council) if a vacancy occurred in that office.

List of past vice-presidents of Council
The following is a list of past vice-presidents of the New Jersey Council from the adoption of the 1776 State Constitution.

1776-81: John Stevens, Hunterdon
 1782: John Cox, Burlington
 1783-84: Philemon Dickinson, Hunterdon
 1785-88: Robert Lettis Hooper, Hunterdon
 1789-92: Elisha Lawrence, Monmouth (acting Governor 1790)
 1793-94: Thomas Henderson, Monmouth (acting Governor 1793 & 1794)
 1795: Elisha Lawrence, Monmouth
 1796-97: James Linn, Somerset
 1798-1800: George Anderson, Burlington
 1801-04: John Lambert, Hunterdon (acting Governor 1802-03)    
 1805: Thomas Little, Monmouth                                                                                            
 1806: George Anderson, Burlington
 1807: Ebenezer Elmer, Cumberland                     
 1808: Ebenezer Seeley, Cumberland                                                                                        
 1809: Thomas Ward, Essex                                                                      
 1810-11: Charles Clark, Essex (acting Governor 1812)                                                                     
 1812: James Schureman, Middlesex                                                                                         
 1813: Charles Clark, Essex                                                                                                   
 1814-15: William Kennedy, Sussex (acting Governor 1815)                                                                  
 1816-22: Jesse Upson, Morris                                                                                             
 1823-25: Peter J. Stryker, Somerset                                                                                      
 1826: Ephraim Bateman, Cumberland                                                                                        
 1827: Silas Cook, Morris
 1828: Caleb Newbold, Burlington                                                                                          
 1829-30: Edward Condict, Morris                                                                                          
 1831-32: Elias P. Seeley, Cumberland (acting Governor 1833)                                                              
 1833: Mahlon Dickerson, Morris                                                                                           
 1834: John Patterson (New Jersey), Monmouth                                                                                           
 1835: Charles Sitgreaves, Warren                                                                                         
 1836: Jeptha P. Munn, Morris                                                                                             
 1837-38: Andrew Parsons, Passaic                                                                                         
 1839-40: Joseph Porter, Gloucester
 1841: John Cassedy, Bergen                                                                                               
 1842: William Chetwood, Essex
 1843: Jehu Patterson, Monmouth
 (1844 elections were for the new New Jersey Senate that met in January 1845)

References
List from "Manual of the Legislature of New Jersey", date: various (pre 1950)

External links
The New Jersey Constitution of 1776

New Jersey Legislature